Gyeonggibuk Science High School (GBS) is a science high school in Uijeongbu, Republic of Korea, established in 2005. It was called Uijeongbu Science High School(UIS) before January 7, 2008. Some Korean students called GBS "Uigwak" which is from the pronunciation of UIS.
There are about 230 students with most going on to university in the second year. GBS covers an area of 25,000 m2 with 18 classrooms and 16 laboratories. All students live in the dormitory, two students to a room.

Achievements in Olympiads
 2006 : The 14th International Environmental Project Olympiad
 2006 : The 11th International Astronomy Olympiad (A gold prize)
 2006 : The 2nd Asia-Pacific Astronomy Olympiad
 2007 : The 12th International Astronomy Olympiad (A gold prize)
 2008 : The 2nd International Olympiad on Astronomy and Astrophysics (A bronze medal)
 2010 : The 18th International Environmental Project Olympiad (The grand prize)
 2010 : The 42nd International Chemistry Olympia (A gold prize)
 2010 : The 4th International Olympiad on Astronomy and Astrophysics (A silver medal)
 2012 : The 6th International Olympiad on Astronomy and Astrophysics (A bronze medal)
 2012 : The 6th Asia-Pacific Informatics Olympiad (A bronze prize)
 2013 : The 25th International Olympiad in Informatics (A gold prize)
 2014 : The 19th International Astronomy Olympiad (A silver prize)
 2015 : The 9th International Olympiad on Astronomy and Astrophysics (A bronze medal)
 2016 : The 21st International Astronomy Olympiad
 2016 : The 10th International Olympiad on Astronomy and Astrophysics (A bronze medal)
 2017 : The 22nd International Astronomy Olympiad (A silver prize)
 2017 : The 11th International Olympiad on Astronomy and Astrophysics (An honorable mention)
 2018 : The 14th Asia-Pacific Astronomy Olympiad (A bronze prize)
 2019 : The 13th International Olympiad on Astronomy and Astrophysics
 2019 : The 24th International Astronomy Olympiad (A silver prize)
 2019 : The 15th Asia-Pacific Astronomy Olympiad
 2020 : (covid-19) International Olympiad on Astronomy and Astrophysics(GeCAA) (A bronze medal)
 2021 : The 14th International Olympiad on Astronomy and Astrophysics (A bronze medal)
 2022 : The 15th International Olympiad on Astronomy and Astrophysics (A bronze medal)

The mark of GBS

The vertical line at the center of the crest represents a pen, which suggests that GBS should be a place of seeking after truth and should be open to all talented students. The letter "S" represents "Science," the arching black line around it symbolizes the orbit of an electron, and "●" symbolizes the atomic nucleus.

The motto of GBS
 Jeolmun(절문, 切問): Digging into a problem with a good question
 Geunsa(근사, 近思): Materializing an idea to be able to practice

Sisterly Relationship
In 2006, GBS set up sisterly relationship with National Hsinchu Senior High School in Taiwan

External links

 Official Homepage 

Science high schools in South Korea
Educational institutions established in 2005
2005 establishments in South Korea
Boarding schools in South Korea